Paul Shewan is an American classical trumpeter who currently plays for the Rochester Philharmonic Orchestra. He is also the Instrumental Music Chair at Roberts Wesleyan College, where he is the Professor of Trumpet as well as the Wind Ensemble and Orchestra conductor.

References

Year of birth missing (living people)
Living people
American trumpeters
American male trumpeters
Roberts Wesleyan University faculty
21st-century trumpeters
21st-century American male musicians